Knefastia walkeri is a species of sea snail, a marine gastropod mollusk in the family Pseudomelatomidae, the turrids and allies.

Description
The length of the shell varies between 37 mm and 67 mm.

Distribution
This species occurs in the Sea of Cortez, Western Mexico

References

 Berry, Samuel Stillman. "West American molluscan miscellany. II." Leaflets in Malacology 1.16 (1958): 91-98.

External links
 
 Gastropods.com: Knefastia walkeri

walkeri
Gastropods described in 1958